Franklin Township is one of fifteen townships in DeKalb County, Indiana. As of the 2010 census, its population was 1,182 and it contained 502 housing units.

History
Franklin Township was organized in 1837, making it the oldest township in DeKalb County.

Geography
Terry Lake is in this township.

Cities and towns
 Hamilton (south quarter)

Unincorporated towns
 Taylor Corner
(This list is based on USGS data and may include former settlements.)

Adjacent townships
 Otsego Township, Steuben County (north)
 Richland Township, Steuben County (northeast)
 Troy Township (east)
 Stafford Township (southeast)
 Wilmington Township (south)
 Grant Township (southwest)
 Smithfield Township (west)
 Steuben Township, Steuben County (northwest)

Major highways
  Indiana State Road 1
  Indiana State Road 427

Cemeteries
The township contains one cemetery, Rude.

References
 
 United States Census Bureau cartographic boundary files

External links

 Indiana Township Association
 United Township Association of Indiana

Townships in DeKalb County, Indiana
Townships in Indiana
1837 establishments in Indiana
Populated places established in 1837